Carl Graham Gilbert (born 20 March 1948) was an English footballer who played as a forward.

Born in Folkestone, Gilbert played professionally for Gillingham, Bristol Rovers and Rotherham United between 1965 and 1974, making a total of 168 Football League appearances.

References

1948 births
Living people
English footballers
People from Folkestone
Footballers from Kent
Margate F.C. players
Gillingham F.C. players
Rotherham United F.C. players
Canterbury City F.C. players
Association football forwards